IQ motif containing GTPase activating protein (IQGAP) is a carrier protein.

It is associated with the Rho GTP-binding protein.

Genes
 IQGAP1, IQGAP2, IQGAP3

See also 
 IQ calmodulin-binding motif

GTP-binding protein regulators